Pierre Alibert (born 26 June 1892, date of death unknown) was a French rower. He competed in the men's coxed four event at the 1912 Summer Olympics.

References

External links

1892 births
Year of death missing
French male rowers
Olympic rowers of France
Rowers at the 1912 Summer Olympics
Sportspeople from Gironde